The Poles River is a tributary of Evans Lake in Regional County Municipality (RCM) of Eeyou Istchee Baie-James (municipality) in the area of the Nord-du-Québec, Canadian province of Quebec, in Canada.

The hydrographic slope of Pôles River is not served by a carriageway. The surface of the river is usually frozen from early November to mid-May, however, safe ice circulation is generally from mid-November to mid-April.

Geography 
The main hydrographic slopes near the Pôles River are:
North side: La Marte river, Nemiscau river;
East side: Théodat Lake, Tésécau Lake;
South side: Le Gardeur Lake, Salamandre River, Broadback River, Nipukatasi River;
West side: Evans Lake, Rabbit Creek, Chabinoche River.

The Poles River originates at the mouth of an unidentified lake (length:  altitude). This source is located at:
 North of the mouth of the Pôles River;
 North of the mouth of Evans Lake;
 Northeast of Lake Soscumica;
 East of the mouth of the Broadback River);
 Northeast of downtown Matagami.

From its source, the "Rivière des Pôles" (English: Poles River) flows on  according to the following segments:
 southwesterly in a marsh zone to the outlet of Lake Michisu (coming from the northwest);
 southwesterly through marsh areas to the outlet of a lake (from the south);
 westerly across marsh areas at the end of the segment to its mouth.

Evans Lake is crossed to the North by the Broadback River.

The mouth of the Pôles River is located at:
 Northeast of the mouth of Evans Lake (confluence with Broadback River);
 Northeast of Soscumica Lake;
 East of the mouth of the Broadback River;
 North of downtown Matagami.

Toponymy 
The toponym "Rivière des Pôles" was made official on December 5, 1968, at the Commission de toponymie du Québec, i.e. at the creation of this commission

References

See also 
James Bay
Rupert Bay
Broadback River, a watercourse
Evans Lake, a body of water
List of rivers of Quebec

Rivers of Nord-du-Québec
Broadback River drainage basin
Eeyou Istchee James Bay